Vinjani or Vinjani Hercegovački is a village located in the municipality of Posušje, Bosnia and Herzegovina. In the 1991 census, the population was 1,159.
The village consists of twelve differently named hamlets that form a community.

Demographics 
According to the 2013 census, its population was 1,423.

References

Populated places in Posušje